Bettles ( in Koyukon; Atchiiniq in Iñupiaq) is a city in Yukon-Koyukuk Census Area, Alaska, United States. It is near Gates of the Arctic National Park and Preserve. The population was 23 at the 2020 census, up from 12 in 2010. It is the second smallest incorporated city in the state.

History
The original village was founded a mile southwest of the junction of the John & Koyukuk Rivers in the late 1890s during the Alaska Gold Rush and was named for Gordon C. Bettles, a newspaper man, Montana Silver prospector, and trader who established the trading post and community in 1898. A post office was established in 1901 and continued intermittently until 1956. Residents began relocating 5 miles east to Evansville, where the airstrip that serves the community today was built in World War II and is now used for commercial air service. The Hickel Highway was used to transport equipment and supplies to the North Slope for oil exploration, and to build the Dalton Highway, which is now used as a truck route to the oilfields. The old village was largely abandoned and the New Bettles was carved out of Evansville and was incorporated in 1985.

Demographics

The demographics of Bettles was Native Alaskan, 32.4%, Non-Hispanic White, 45.4%, Black-African American 0.2%, Hispanic of any race, 0.5%, Native Hawaiian-Pacific Islander 0.1%

Old Bettles (1930–1960)

The original village of Bettles first appeared on the 1930 U.S. Census as an unincorporated village. At that time, it was located on the west bank of the Koyukuk River, a mile west of its junction with the John River . With the construction of the airfield at Evansville 5 miles east, residents began relocating away by the 1940s and the post office closed in 1956. The original village would later be known as "Old Bettles." It would apparently last appear on the 1960 U.S. Census, although it is not entirely clear if the figures for 1950 and 1960 were for the settlement of the old village or for the new settlement around the airstrip in Evansville. It was reported the last residents left the old village in 1997, though several buildings still remain two decades later.

New Bettles (1990–present)

The present day city of "New" Bettles is about 5 miles east of the old settlement surrounding the Bettles Airstrip and was originally known as Evansville. It is located on the south bank of the Koyukuk River and east of where the John River flows into it. . Although the area began to be settled around World War II with the construction of the airfield, it was not entirely clear if the population figures for 1950 and 1960 were for the "New" Bettles or the old village, which still was occupied until 1997. When Bettles ceased to report after the 1960 census, the area around the airfield reported as the unincorporated village of Evansville on the 1970 census and as a census-designated place on the 1980 census. In 1985, a section of unincorporated Evansville was carved out and incorporated as the city of Bettles, and it has appeared on the U.S. Census again beginning in 1990.

As of the census of 2000, there were 43 people, 16 households, and 9 families residing in the city. The population density was 26.2 people per square mile (10.1 per km2). There were 36 housing units at an average density of 21.9/sq mi (8.5 per km). The racial makeup of the city was 76.74% White, 18.60% Native American, and 4.65% from two or more races.

There were 16 households, out of which 37.5% had children under the age of 18 living with them, 50.0% were married couples living together, 6.3% had a female householder with no husband present, and 43.8% were non-families. 18.8% of all households were made up of individuals, and none had someone living alone who was 65 years of age or older. The average household size was 2.69 and the average family size was 3.44.

In the city, the population was spread out, with 30.2% under the age of 18, 7.0% from 18 to 24, 37.2% from 25 to 44, 25.6% from 45 to 64. The median age was 34 years. For every 100 females, there were 104.8 males. For every 100 females age 18 and over, there were 130.8 males.

The median income for a household in the city was $49,375, and the median income for a family was $65,000. Males had a median income of $47,917 versus $48,750 for females. The per capita income for the city was $19,585. There were 10.0% of families and 6.4% of the population living below the poverty line, including 11.1% of under eighteens and none of those over 64.

The population of Bettles has decreased since 2000. The 2010 census estimated the population at 12 and the latest census estimates remain at 12. The Alaska Department of Labor and Workforce development estimates the 2017 population at 9. As of the 2020 census, the population has risen to 23.

Geography
Bettles is located on the southeast bank of the Koyukuk River at  (66.913419, −151.522374). The city is on the former Hickel Highway, that now connects to the Dalton Highway as a winter ice road only and crosses the Jim River.
The city is also served by a  gravel airstrip built by the military.

Climate
As is typical of the Alaska Interior, Bettles experiences a subarctic climate (Köppen Dfc) with very long, frigid winters and short, warm summers, and is located in USDA Plant Hardiness Zone 1, indicating the coldest temperature of the year is typically at or below . The threat of frost usually begins in late August, but sometimes it can happen during the first half of that month. A majority of the annual precipitation of  occurs during summer as well.

Notes

Education
The community was previously served by the Bettles Field School of the Yukon–Koyukuk School District.

Transportation
Bettles Airport's commercial and freight airline service is provided by Wright Air Service, with daily service to and from Fairbanks and other communities.

Notable people 
 Aliy Zirkle (born 1970), sled dog racer
 Otto W. Geist (1888–1963), archaeologist, explorer, naturalist

References

Cities in Alaska
Cities in Yukon–Koyukuk Census Area, Alaska
Populated places of the Arctic United States
Populated places established in 1896
1896 establishments in Alaska